Galehead Mountain is a mountain located in Grafton County, New Hampshire.  The mountain is part of the Twin Range of the White Mountains. Galehead is flanked to the east by South Twin Mountain, and to the west by Mount Garfield.  The summit is reached by the Frost Trail which departs from Galehead Hut (operated by the Appalachian Mountain Club).  There are several ways to reach the hut from one's car, the Gale River Trail from the northwest being the most direct.

Galehead is so named because it is located above the headwaters of the North Branch of the Gale River. The north face of Galehead drains into the North Branch, thence via the Gale River into the Ammonoosuc and Connecticut rivers, and into Long Island Sound in Connecticut. The southeast face of Galehead drains into Twin Brook, thence into the Franconia Branch of the East Branch of the Pemigewasset River, through the Pemigewasset Wilderness, thence into the Pemigewasset and Merrimack rivers, and into the Gulf of Maine in Massachusetts. The west face of Galehead also drains into the Franconia Branch.

The Appalachian Mountain Club's Galehead Hut is located in the col between Galehead and South Twin.

See also 

 List of mountains in New Hampshire
 White Mountain National Forest

References

External links 
 AMC: Galehead
  hikethewhites.com: Galehead

Mountains of Grafton County, New Hampshire
Mountains of New Hampshire
New England Four-thousand footers
Mountains on the Appalachian Trail